The Tivoli Hotel was built in 1926-27 as a 6-story, T-shaped brick building in Second Renaissance Revival architectural style.  The hotel was added to the National Register of Historic Places in 1984.  In 2005, the structure was badly damaged during Hurricane Katrina and was subsequently demolished.

History
The Tivoli Hotel contained 64 guest rooms in addition to its lobby, dining room, and ballroom.  It was considered to be a luxury hotel for its time.  During the 1930s, 40s, and 50s, gambling was an accepted form of tourism at hotels along the Mississippi Gulf Coast, and slot machines were available to guests in the Tivoli Hotel lobby.

In the 1950s, the structure was renovated and became the Trade Winds Hotel.
With competition from modern-day hotels along the Gulf Coast, the Trade Winds slumped into a state of disrepair in the 1970s and served as an apartment complex for transient guests.  By the 1990s, the main hotel building was closed to the public.  Although attempts were made by the owner to sell the property, potential developers were not willing to retain the original building in their redevelopment plans.

In 2003, the Mississippi Heritage Trust listed the Tivoli Hotel as one of the ten most endangered landmarks in Mississippi.

During August 2005, any plans for saving the Tivoli Hotel were lost when sustained winds of 120 mph (195 km/h) and a 27-foot (8.2 m) tidal surge from Hurricane Katrina pushed a casino barge into the southeast corner of the structure.  During the months that followed, plans were formulated by cities, counties, and the State to recover from the hurricane's devastation.  As part of those recovery efforts, the Tivoli Hotel property was rezoned for waterfront gaming.  In May 2006, the Tivoli Hotel was demolished.

See also
Historic Grand Hotels on the Mississippi Gulf Coast

References

External links
 Historical Marker Database - The Tivoli Hotel

Former National Register of Historic Places in Mississippi
Buildings and structures in Biloxi, Mississippi
Hotel buildings completed in 1927
Buildings and structures demolished in 2006
National Register of Historic Places in Harrison County, Mississippi
Demolished buildings and structures in Mississippi